Capeta is a Japanese manga series written and illustrated by Masahito Soda. The manga won the Kodansha Manga Award for the shōnen category in 2005.

The series consists of three separate arcs. The first is about Capeta's first experiences with kart racing at the age of 10. The next arc, which starts four years later, deals with Capeta trying to handle his growing financial issues due to the high cost involved in kart racing. The third is about Capeta trying to realize his dream of beating his rival and becoming a professional racer, venturing through into a more senior category: Formula Three. Both the anime and manga features numerous references and homages to Initial D and Best Motoring International, as well as Formula One. In addition to this, there are many karting and racing references that not only add flesh to the story, but are also factual (such as comments about racing lines, tire usage, slipstreaming and general commentary on the world of four-wheel racing).

Plot
While completing a paving job at a go-kart track, his father sees a young boy racing at the track and is amazed at the speed and seeming thrill of the sport. Realizing that his young son has an interest in racing cars (particularly Formula One), Shigei asks the circuit steward as to whether he is able to take some old worn-down parts out of the circuit's trash pile. Taking these back to his workplace, he manages to construct a rundown yet drivable kart. Shigei's boss, Mr. Ikari, (initially begrudgingly) supplies a 4-stroke generator engine to power the kart.

Determined, Capeta, in his first time on a race track, manages to not only master the mangled racer, but also catches and attempts to overtake  on the inside line, a talented young racer who drives for a works karting team, Endless Autohouse Racing. This overtaking maneuver shocks Naomi so much so that he drops the accelerator of his kart, accelerates past Capeta. This infuriates his mother and team manager, as he over-revved a brand new engine which he was supposed to be merely running in. Nobu Andou and Monami Suzuki, Capeta's best friends, support him in his karting – Nobu as his technical assistant/manager and Monami as the self-appointed team manager.

Capeta, unaware of the difference in machinery between his own kart and Naomi's works-grade kart, does not understand why it was impossible for him to catch Naomi. Nonetheless, onlookers are amazed that a child from out of the blue is able to push his machine to such a limit, let alone unnerve the track's local hotshot. Nanako, also amazed, offers to help Capeta's entry into the world of kart racing, secretly as a rival for her son. After what is a difficult conversation for Capeta, the Taira father and son turn down the offer to enroll Capeta in the Endless Autohouse Racing team and run their own single kart team on their own instead.

In the second arc, Capeta has grown up. He is now 14 years old, in 3rd grade of junior high school and has won the junior karting class he had competed in. His racing suit and kart are now blue, his racing number having changed from 14 to 30. Nobu and Monami have also matured a lot while still helping Capeta with his karting aspirations. Having stepped up to a more senior class (ICA Class), he realizes that to win races is a lot harder without the support of a well-funded team. In what he sees as his final chance – a race in torrential downpour – he pushes himself to the limit so as to give himself the best chance of winning, but is relegated to second by the smallest of margins and fractures his ribcage in the process. After he is hospitalized, he is introduced to a one-make automobile racing formula known as Formula Stella (an indirect reference to Formula Toyota). As he was exceptionally talented in kart racing, Nobu presents Capeta as a candidate to attend FSRS, the Formula Stella Racing School. After proving to the head of Stella's racing arm that Capeta was worthy, Nobu is given the enrollment paperwork. One condition stressed by the Stella management is that crashing is absolutely prohibited – not simply for the loss of money incurred, but also the loss of confidence in that racer to produce results under racing conditions.

Although not having so much as the ability to change gears in a regular car at the start, Capeta quickly progresses to be one of the fastest students in the school. During the qualifying for the mock race on the last day though, Capeta crashes due to not being able to avoid a slower racer who had lost control of his car and spun on the track. Capeta was taking a blind uphill figure-S corner, so he couldn't see ahead. By the time Capeta's instructor, Shinkawa Hideki, told him to watch out, Capeta locks up his car's brakes and the two machines crash. No one was hurt in the incident, but Capeta was devastated due to breaking his promise of not crashing and feels that his future in racing is over. His father, though, does not give up and encourages Capeta to continue – despite the ¥1,500,000 damage costs from Capeta's accident.

He uses his talents, going on to win his races, defeating his team's talented racers and making him a series winner despite an engine failure late in the final race, but still managed to win the race with Shiba Ryou close by. Nobu admits that he wants to become the best racing manager and that he'd always be with Capeta until the very end. The last episode ends with an outlook at the near future: it is narrated that Naomi and Capeta race against one another in the Italian Grand Prix at Monza. The last narration was: "Both racers are very talented. It's a fight between two Japanese".

Characters
Taira Capeta
Kappeita, nicknamed Capeta for short, is 10 years old at the beginning of the anime. He is 14 in the 2nd arc and 16 in the 3rd arc. Capeta steps into the world of kart racing when his father fixed him a kart. Even before this, Capeta had shown an interest in cars. He is very talented, showing his adaptability, balance, and brilliance on the track. There are lot of people who are drawn to Capeta's racing and say that he gives them something to look forward to. His mother died when he was young so he did every housework from when he was little. Capeta would eventually race in Formula One. Minamoto Naomi is his greatest rival; Capeta  wants to race him but feels that Minamoto is always one step ahead of him.
Sarukkī
A monkey who is Capeta's pet and serves as a mascot for the team. He was originally owned by Momotarou and was named Reinhardt III. He was re-named after he took a liking to the members of Team Capeta and Momotarou decided to give the monkey to Capeta as a gift.

Taira Shigei
Father of Taira Capeta. He works for a paving company and is mostly not home. He tries to work overtime to make more money since his family is very poor. In the beginning, he thinks that Taira is an obedient, quiet kid since he gives no trouble but after seeing him in the kart he fixed Shigei realizes that Taira was being reserved. He later supports Taira in his years of kart racing and a racer.

Monami
Childhood friend of Taira Capeta. She is very aggressive and forceful but kind and caring. Monami is the biggest supporter of Taira's team. She calls herself Team Capeta's coach. Later, she becomes a singer to bring more happiness other than to Taira and Nobu but still supports them.

Nobu
At first, he bullied Taira because he thought it was annoying how Taira wasn't serious about anything but becomes friends with him after finally seeing him motivated. Nobu admits that he wants to become the best racing manager and that he'd always be with Capeta until the very end.

Minamoto Naomi
Naomi is only one year older than Taira. He is very serious in karts and cars. Naomi never lost in a race and is always hard on himself and to others. He realizes the unfairness in the world better than anyone else. The only thing that interest him is Formula One. After seeing Taira's first race, he began to see him as his rival. Unknown to Taira, Minamoto also wishes to race against him. Though he doesn't say it, he shows great interest in Taira.

Episodes
In the anime, there are 52 episodes and each episode is called a "Lap".

	Overcome the Limiter!
	My Kart!
	First Circuit!
	Full Throttle!
	Rival!
	Team Capeta!
	Entry!
	Crash!
	Course Record!
	Time Trial!
	Start!
	Battle!
	Team Order!
	Winner!
	Step Up!
	Penalty!
	Overtake!
	Sponsor!
	Festival!
	Partner!
	Racing History
	Pressure!
	Last Chance!
	Condition!
	Reverse!
       Traction!
	Blue flag!
       Challenge!
	Slick tire!
	Hard Rain!
	Side by side!
	Final lap!
	Presentation!
       Scout!
	Performance!
	Idling!
       New Machine!
	Formula stele!
	First Step!
	Shift Up!
	Blind Corner!
	Turning Point!
	Hit Up!
	Pit In!
	Victory Road!
	Audition!
	Perfect Win!
	Next Stage!
	Versus!
	Second Driver!
	Red Zone!
	Checkered Flag!

References

External links
TV Tokyo's Capeta website  

Kodansha manga
Motorsports in anime and manga
Shōnen manga
TV Tokyo original programming
Winner of Kodansha Manga Award (Shōnen)
Animated television series about children
Animated television series about auto racing